Zagužane is a village in the municipality of Leskovac, Serbia. According to the 2002 census, the village has a population of 339 people. Tulovska River flows through the village.

References

Populated places in Jablanica District